Jamkhed taluka, is a taluka in Karjat subdivision of Ahmednagar district in Maharashtra State of India.

Area

The table below shows area of the taluka by land type.

Villages
There are around 88 villages in Jamkhed taluka. For list of villages see Villages in Jamkhed taluka.
Kharda-
Kharda is a major village in Jamkhed taluka. This village is of special historical significance. The famous Bhuikot fort is located in this village. The tallest saffron flag in India will be hoisted on this fort.Nannaj is a very famous village in Jamkhed taluka. Ashadi Yatra is famous in Nannaj village. Various interesting programs are organized in this yatra. Various toy shops as well as food shops

Population
The table below shows population  of the taluka by sex. The data is as per 2001 census.

Rain Fall
The Table below details of rainfall from year 1981 to 2004.

See also
 Talukas in Ahmednagar district
 Villages in Jamkhed taluka

References

Talukas in Maharashtra
Cities and towns in Ahmednagar district
Talukas in Ahmednagar district